Wolf girl may refer to:
 a female werewolf
 a female character raised by wolves (such as San from the film Princess Mononoke)
 Wolf Girl (film), a 2001 Canadian/Romanian horror film
 Wolf Girl (band), an indie pop band from London, England
 Wolf Girl and Black Prince, a Japanese shōjo manga series written by Ayuko Hatta

See also 
 Wolf man (disambiguation)